Khorramābād is a city and capital of Khorramabad District, Tonekabon County, Mazandaran Province, Iran.  At the 2006 census, its population was 9,936, in 2,784 families.

References

Populated places in Tonekabon County

Cities in Mazandaran Province